Øm may refer to:

 Øm (village), in Lejre Municipality, Denmark
 Øm Abbey, an old monastery (now ruins) in central Jutland, Denmark